Szczepan Hołowczyc de armis Pierzchała (19 August 1741–27 August 1823) was Archbishop of Warsaw from 17 December 1819 until his death and a Senator of Congress Poland.

He was the son of Basil and Mary Hołowczyc, who came from a Belarusian noble family that was located near Pinsk. He would be ordained in 1772. From 1774 to 1776, he would travel Europe for scientific purposes; upon returning to Poland, he was made secretary to Andrzej Młodziejowski and later Michał Jerzy Poniatowski. He would serve as canon at the cathedrals of the Archdiocese of Warsaw in 1781 and of the Archdiocese of Kraków in 1783; he would also act as dean of the cathedral of the Diocese of Kielce. On 6 March 1819, he would be appointed and consecrated as the first Bishop of the Diocese of Sandomierz; he would be made Archbishop of Warsaw in 1820, with Adam Prosper Burzyński succeeding him as Bishop of Sandomierz.

On 17 December 1819, Hołowczyc would be appointed Primate of Poland, succeeding Poniatowski. He would die on 27 August 1823; his funeral was held on 5 September.

Notes

References

Archbishops of Warsaw
1741 births
1823 deaths
Senators of Congress Poland